Prince Yi may refer to any of the following princely peerages of the Qing dynasty in China:

 Prince Yi (怡), created in 1722
 Prince Yi (儀), created in 1797